Lieutenant-General Sir Robert Francis Richardson  (2 March 1929 – 21 November 2014) was a British Army officer. Among other posts, he commanded a battalion and a brigade during the Troubles before becoming General Officer Commanding in Northern Ireland from 1982 to 1985.

Regimental career
He was educated at George Heriot's School, Edinburgh, and then at the Royal Military Academy Sandhurst. He was commissioned into the Royal Scots as a second lieutenant on 16 December 1949, after leaving Sandhurst, and posted to the 1st Battalion. He was promoted to lieutenant on 16 December 1951, and briefly saw service at the end of the Korean War. He then travelled with the battalion to the Middle East, where he was promoted to captain on 16 December 1955. After service with the British Army of the Rhine, he studied at the Defence Services Staff College in India from 1960-1961.

He was then posted to staff duties at the Ministry of Defence until 1964, when he attended the Joint Services Staff College. Whilst at the Ministry of Defence, he was promoted to major on 16 December 1962. He was appointed a Member of the Order of the British Empire (MBE) in the 1965 New Year Honours.

He was brigade major of the Aden Brigade during the Aden Emergency in 1967, where he was Mentioned in Despatches. He then returned to staff duties at the Ministry of Defence, receiving his promotion to lieutenant-colonel on 31 December 1968, and was appointed as commanding officer of the 1st Battalion, Royal Scots in 1969, a post he held until 1971. During his time in command, the battalion made a number of short tours to Northern Ireland. He was promoted to Officer of the Order of the British Empire (OBE) in the 1971 New Year Honours.

He was then appointed to the staff at the Staff College, Camberley, and promoted to colonel on 30 June 1972.

Senior command
He was promoted brigadier on 31 December 1973, and appointed commander of 39th Infantry Brigade, based in Northern Ireland, the following year. For his work in Northern Ireland, he was promoted to Commander of the Order of the British Empire (CBE).

In 1975, he was appointed the Deputy Adjutant General of the British Army of the Rhine (BAOR), and on 24 January 1978, he was appointed Commandant of the British Sector in Berlin, with the acting rank of major-general, and received substantive promotion on 22 July 1978. He was appointed Commander of the Royal Victorian Order (CVO) on 25 May 1978. He relinquished command on 15 September 1980.

On 19 December 1980, he was appointed Vice-Adjutant General, and Director of Manning for the Army at the Ministry of Defence, and relinquished the appointment on 29 March 1982.

He succeeded Sir Richard Lawson as GOC Northern Ireland on 1 June 1982, was promoted to lieutenant-general on the same date, and was appointed Knight Commander of the Order of the Bath (KCB) on 12 June 1982. He had previously commanded both a roulement battalion and a resident brigade in Northern Ireland, giving him experience of the issues faced in the region. His tour as GOC was mainly marked by a gradual process of reducing the role of Army units in day-to-day security, handing over control to the Royal Ulster Constabulary. He was relieved by Robert Pascoe in June 1985.

Ceremonial posts
On 31 August 1980, he was appointed Colonel of the Royal Scots, and held the post for ten years, until 31 August 1990. He was appointed the Lieutenant of the Tower of London on 1 March 1992, and held the post until 1 March 1995.

His medals are now held in the Museum of the Royal Scots in Edinburgh Castle.

Personal life
He was married to Maureen (d. 1986) and had four children, Claire, Charles, Jeremy and Guy.

References 

 

|-
 

1929 births
2014 deaths
Academics of the Staff College, Camberley
British Army lieutenant generals
Royal Scots officers
People educated at George Heriot's School
Graduates of the Royal Military Academy Sandhurst
British military personnel of the Aden Emergency
Knights Commander of the Order of the Bath
Commanders of the Royal Victorian Order
Commanders of the Order of the British Empire
British Army personnel of the Korean War
Lieutenants of the Tower of London
British military personnel of The Troubles (Northern Ireland)
People from Leith
Military personnel from Edinburgh
Defence Services Staff College alumni